North Moniteau Township is one of fourteen townships in Cooper County, Missouri, USA.  As of the 2000 census, its population was 182.

Geography
According to the United States Census Bureau, North Moniteau Township covers an area of 26.8 square miles (69.42 square kilometers).

Unincorporated towns
 Pisgah at 
(This list is based on USGS data and may include former settlements.)

Adjacent townships
 Prairie Home Township (northeast)
 Linn Township, Moniteau County (east)
 Walker Township, Moniteau County (southeast)
 South Moniteau Township (south)
 Kelly Township (west)
 Clark Fork Township (northwest)

Cemeteries
The township contains these two cemeteries: Jones and Strickfaden.

School districts
 Cooper County C-4
 Prairie Home R-V School District

Political districts
 Missouri's 6th congressional district
 State House District 117
 State Senate District 21

References
 United States Census Bureau 2008 TIGER/Line Shapefiles
 United States Board on Geographic Names (GNIS)
 United States National Atlas

External links
 US-Counties.com
 City-Data.com

Townships in Cooper County, Missouri
Townships in Missouri